John Hudson (born 30 May 1956) is a reporter on Television New Zealand's "Sunday" programme.

His career began with the New Zealand Herald in 1975, and he later worked at Radio Hauraki and 89FM. After working for the BBC for a few years, he joined Television New Zealand in 1984.

Education
John Hudson received his education from the University of Auckland where he studied art history, English, and politics. He also played for the rugby team at the university.

Experience
John Hudson has had the following experience:
Reporter at 89fm
Script editor at Visnews
newshound at Radio Hauraki
Reporter at New Zealand Herald

See also
 Sunday
 List of New Zealand television personalities

References

External links
TVNZ profile

1956 births
Living people
New Zealand journalists
New Zealand television presenters